Japanese football in 1933.

Emperor's Cup

Births
January 1 - Waichiro Omura
March 24 - Shigeo Yaegashi
June 15 - Yasukazu Tanaka
November 17 - Isao Iwabuchi
December 14 - Hisataka Okamoto

External links

 
Seasons in Japanese football